Bottle It In is the eighth studio album by American musician Kurt Vile, released on October 12, 2018 through Matador Records. It features contributions from Kim Gordon, Cass McCombs, Stella Mozgawa of Warpaint, and Mary Lattimore.

The album was preceded by the singles "Loading Zones" and "Bassackwards".

Songs
"Hysteria" was written en route to a recording session. Both "Hysteria" and "Cold Was the Wind" reference Vile's fear of flying.

Vile started writing "Mutinies" as a teenager, expanding it and rewriting sections numerous times over the ensuing decades.

Recording
The album was recorded with various producers in numerous studios and cities across the United States in between Vile's touring schedule. Vile recounted: "I'd go into the studio straight from tour for a day or so, sometimes by myself, sometimes with a band. Go on trips in between or combine different things, like tour into the studio, into meeting my family, into travelling across the country and back into the studio. Combining all things, not compartmentalising as much, keeping it all like everyday life."

Critical reception

According to review aggregator Metacritic, Bottle It In has received an average score of 78 based on reviews from 24 critics, indicating "generally favorable reviews". Sam Sodomsky of Pitchfork deemed the highlight of the album to be second single "Bassackwards", which he called "10 minutes of warped, psychedelic folk-rock, like a long sigh in the face of existential dread". Sodomsky noted that the album has a loose structure with "more accessible tracks up front and a meditative, somewhat indulgent back-half", and summarized that the album feels like Vile is lost in an "in-between moment".

Track listing

All songs written by Kurt Vile with the exception of "Rollin' with the Flow" which was written by Jerry Hayes.

Notes
 "(Bottle Back)" is stylized in lowercase.

Personnel
Kurt Vile – lead and backing vocals, electric and acoustic guitars (except on tracks 8, 10, and 13), keyboards (except on tracks 1 and 4), harmonica (tracks 1 and 5), tambourine (tracks 2, 9, and 12), banjo (track 10)

The Violators
Rob Laakso – bass, synthesizer (track 1), backing vocal (track 1), drum machine (tracks 2 and 9), drums (track 2), electric and acoustic guitars (tracks 2, 3, 6, 8, and 13), strings (track 6), sequencer (track 7), percussion (track 12)
Kyle Spence – drums (tracks 1, 3, and 6), percussion (track 3)
Jesse Trbovich – electric guitar (tracks 1, 3, 6, 8, and 10)

Additional musicians
Joe Kennedy – keyboards (tracks 3, 4, 6, and 7), electric guitar (track 9), backing vocal (track 1)
Mary Lattimore – harp (tracks 4, 6, and 8)
Barbara Gruska – drums (tracks 4 and 9), percussion (track 9)
Stella Mozgawa – drums (tracks 5, 8, and 11), percussion (track 5), backing vocal (track 5), bass (track 8), synthesizer (track 8)
Vince Nudo – drums (track 7), percussion (track 7)
Kyle Crane – drums (track 10)
Farmer Dave Scher – backing vocal (track 5), keyboards (track 9), lap steel guitar (track 10)
Kim Gordon – acoustic guitar feedback (track 9)
Eric D. Johnson – backing vocal (track 1)
Margaret Yen – backing vocal (track 1)
Farrah Katina – backing vocal (track 1)
Robert Robinson – backing vocals (tracks 1 and 3)
Deb Warfield – backing vocal (track 6)
Cass McCombs – backing vocal (track 8)
Jess Wolfe – backing vocal (track 10)
Holly Laessig – backing vocal (track 10)
Hetty Marriot-Brittan – backing vocal (track 11)

Production
Tracks 1, 3, and 6 produced by Kurt Vile, the Violators, and Peter Katis; mixed by Peter Katis
Tracks 2, 7, and 10 produced by Kurt Vile, Rob Laasko, and Peter Katis; mixed by Peter Katis
Track 4 produced by Kurt Vile and Shawn Everett; mixed by Shawn Everett
Tracks 5, 8, and 11 produced and mixed by Rob Schnapf
Tracks 9 and 12 produced by Kurt Vile, Rob Laasko, and Shawn Everett; mixed by Shawn Everett
Track 13 produced by Kurt Vile; mixed by Rob Schnapf

Charts

Weekly charts

Year-end charts

References

2018 albums
Kurt Vile albums
Matador Records albums